Male Srakane is an island in the Croatian part of the Adriatic Sea, which is situated between Lošinj, Unije and Susak, just south of Vele Srakane.

Name
During the Austro-Hungarian Empire (until end of World War I) the two islands were called Klein- und Gross-Kanidol.

Inhabitants
According to statistics it has a current, reported population of just two people, who only reside temporarily on the island in the summer. The inhabitants usually make a living from fishing and agriculture. In 1940-50 approximately 30 people made a living on the island and by late 1960 only two ladies remained on the island. The two residents that live on the island are not original residents.

References

Islets of Croatia
Populated places in Primorje-Gorski Kotar County
Islands of the Adriatic Sea